A list of the films produced in Mexico in 1986 (see 1986 in film):

1986

External links

1986
Films
Lists of 1986 films by country or language